Spinifex is a genus of perennial coastal plants in the grass family.

They are one of the most common plants that grow in sand dunes along the coasts of Africa, Middle East, Asia, Australia, New Zealand, and New Caledonia, with the ranges of some species extending north and west along the coasts of Asia as far as India and Japan. As they help stabilise the sand, these grasses are an important part of the entire sand dune ecosystem.  The single species indigenous to New Zealand, Spinifex sericeus, is also found in Australia.

Confusingly, the word "spinifex" is also used as a common name referring to grasses in the related genus Triodia. Triodia however is native to inland Australia and refers to a group of spiny-leaved, tussock-forming grasses.

Species 
Species include:
 Spinifex × alterniflorus Nees – Western Australia
 Spinifex hirsutus Labill. – all 6 states of Australia
 Spinifex littoreus (Burm.f.) Merr. – Ashmore Reef in Western Australia; New Guinea, Indonesia, Malaysia, Philippines, Indochina, Indian subcontinent, China (Fujian, Guangdong, Guangxi, Hainan), Taiwan, Japan including Ryukyu Islands
 Spinifex longifolius R.Br. – Thailand, Indonesia, New Guinea, Queensland, Northern Territory, Western Australia, South Australia
 Spinifex sericeus R.Br. – all 6 states of Australia plus Norfolk Island, New Zealand, New Caledonia, Tonga

Formerly included 
Species formerly included:
 Spinifex paradoxus (now Zygochloa paradoxa)

References

Panicoideae
Poaceae genera
Grasses of Asia
Poales of Australia
Taxa named by Carl Linnaeus